The Blood is an album by Christian alternative rock artist Kevin Max that was released December 26, 2007.

Overview
Unlike Max's previous albums (both solo and as part of dc Talk), The Blood is a gospel album instead of having his usual rock stylings. Max had commented for the press release, stating, "It has taken me almost two decades to come full circle and realize how much gospel music has inspired me and influenced my decisions in music." He also explains a bit more on the style, stating, "The Blood is not a classic hymns cover project or a white/homogenized version of black gospel or soul music, it's a sensitive and stylized adaptation of the music that was at the root of rock and roll, blues, and popular culture."

Track listing

Personnel 
 Kevin Max – lead vocals, backing vocals, keyboards, handclaps
 John Fields – keyboards (2), guitars (2), bass (2)
 Phil Madeira – Hammond B3 organ (7), organ (7)
 Ronald Rawls – Rhodes piano (9)
 Will Owsley – guitars, bass
 Vince Gill – guitars (6, 9)
 John Mark Painter – bass (3, 4), horns (3, 4)
 Dorian "Wookie" Crozier – drums (2, 6, 9)
 Bobby Huff – drums (3, 4, 8)
 Ashley Cleveland – backing vocals (6, 8, 9)
 Judson Spence – backing vocals (6, 8, 9)
 Kim Keyes – backing vocals (6, 8, 9)

Production 
 Jamie Warden – executive producer 
 Will Owsley – producer, engineer, mixing 
 Kevin Max – co-producer, additional lyrics 
 Hank Williams – mastering at MasterMix (Nashville, Tennessee)
 Dave Darr – design, layout 
 Allen Clark – photography

References

External links
Exclusive interview with Kevin at NRT

Kevin Max albums
2007 albums